Peter Shields (born 14 August 1960) is a Scottish former footballer who played for Ipswich Town, Hearts, Partick Thistle and Cowdenbeath.

References

External links
 Pride of Anglia, Peter Shields

1960 births
Living people
Footballers from Glasgow
People from Baillieston
Association football defenders
Scottish footballers
Ipswich Town F.C. players
Heart of Midlothian F.C. players
Partick Thistle F.C. players
Cowdenbeath F.C. players
Scottish Football League players